Since Idaho became a U.S. state in 1890, it has sent congressional delegations to the United States Senate and United States House of Representatives. Each state elects two senators to serve for six years, and members of the House to two-year terms. Before becoming a state, the Idaho Territory elected a non-voting delegate at-large to Congress from 1864 to 1890.

These are tables of congressional delegations from Idaho to the United States Senate and the United States House of Representatives.

Current delegation 

Idaho's current congressional delegation in the  consists of its two senators and two representatives, all of whom are Republicans.

The current dean of the Idaho delegation is Senator Mike Crapo, having served in the Senate since 1999 and in Congress since 1993.

United States Senate

United States House of Representatives

1864–1890: 1 non-voting delegate 
Starting on February 1, 1864, Idaho Territory sent a non-voting delegate to the House.

1890–1913: 1 seat 
Following statehood on July 3, 1890, Idaho had one seat in the House.

1913–present: 2 seats 
Following the 1910 census, Idaho was apportioned a second seat. It elected both seats statewide at-large on a general ticket, until 1919, when it redistricted into two districts.

Key

See also

List of United States congressional districts
Idaho's congressional districts
Political party strength in Idaho

References 

Politics of Idaho
Idaho
Congressional delegations